Glengarnock railway station is a railway station in the village of Glengarnock, North Ayrshire, Scotland, serving the towns of Beith and Kilbirnie. The station is managed by ScotRail and is on the Ayrshire Coast Line.

History 
The station was opened on 21 July 1840 by the Glasgow, Paisley, Kilmarnock and Ayr Railway (later part of the Glasgow and South Western Railway) and was named Glengarnock and Kilbirnie. The station is marked on an 1897 Ordnance Survey maps as Kilbirnie Station. It was renamed Glengarnock on 1 June 1905 to coincide with the opening of the dedicated Kilbirnie railway station on the Dalry and North Johnstone Line. Although this Kilbirnie station closed in 1966, the original station has continued to use only Glengarnock as its name.

Services 
There are three trains per hour between Glengarnock and Glasgow in both directions for most of the day, reduced to a half-hourly service in the evenings.

References

Notes

Sources

External links
Video of the station in 2015

Railway stations in North Ayrshire
Former Glasgow and South Western Railway stations
Railway stations in Great Britain opened in 1840
Railway stations served by ScotRail
SPT railway stations